The Jardin botanique d'Alaije is a botanical garden with an emphasis on vegetables, located in Brantôme, Dordogne, Aquitaine, France. It is open weekdays; admission is free.

The garden opened to the public in 1998, and currently contains about 800 plant varieties with a focus on ancient and forgotten vegetables, but also including ornamental, aromatic, and medicinal plants, etc. It is organized into eight sections: medieval, vegetables, Solanaceae, square gardens, aromatics, grasses, Cucurbitaceae, and medicinal plants.

See also 
 List of botanical gardens in France

References 
 Jardin botanique d'Alaije
 Gralon.net entry (French)
 Parc Naturel Perigord-Limousin entry (French)
 Jardins de Pareillas blog entry (French)

Alaije, Jardin botanique d'
Alaije, Jardin botanique d'